Secret Sinners is a 1933 American drama film directed by Wesley Ford and starring Jack Mulhall, Sue Carol and Nick Stuart.

Cast
 Jack Mulhall as Jeff Gilbert
 Sue Carol as Sue Marsh
 Nick Stuart as Jimmy Stafford
 Cecilia Parker as Margie Dodd
 Natalie Moorhead as Mrs. Gilbert
 Armand Kaliz as Armand Blum
 Bert Roach as The Out of Work Actor
 Gertrude Short as Sue's Chum - the Chorus Girl
 Eddie Kane as Mr. Edwards - the Stage Manager
 William Humphrey as The Music Publisher 
 Tom Ricketts as Pop - the Stage Doorman
 Paul Ellis as Travers - the Gigolo
 Lillian Leighton as Mrs. Simmons 
 Phillips Smalley as Lawyer Marsh
 Lee Zahler as Lee Zahler - Orchestra Leader
 Harry Barris as Harry Barris - Pianist

References

Bibliography
 Michael R. Pitts. Poverty Row Studios, 1929–1940: An Illustrated History of 55 Independent Film Companies, with a Filmography for Each. McFarland & Company, 2005.

External links
 

1933 films
1933 drama films
American drama films
American black-and-white films
Mayfair Pictures films
1930s English-language films
Films directed by Wesley Ford
1930s American films